MGIRI Mahatma Gandhi Institute for Rural Industrialization (MGIRI), earlier named as National Institute for Rural Industrilization (NIRI), is an autonomous institution located in Wardha, Maharashtra, India whose purpose is to accelerate the process of rural industrialization by providing  science and technology support. It is inspired by the Gandhian vision of sustainable and self reliant village economy.

History 
Mahatma Gandhi came to Wardha in 1934, at the invitation of Jamnalalji Bajaj. In April 1936, Gandhi established his residence in the village Shegaon which he renamed as Sevagram. From 1934-1936 Gandhi stayed at the place where MGIRI stands today. His cottage has been well preserved by institute, housing a library, office and guest house.
The  place was donated by Bajaj Group of Industries to Govt. Of India as a tribute to Mahatma. KVIC  thus collaborated in many projects with NIRI for developing rural technologies. Establishment of  MGIRI was approved by the Cabinet Committee on Economic Affairs, Government of India, on 28 February, 2016 as an autonomous body under the Indian Societies Registration Act.

Divisions 
MGIRI consists of six major divisions:

 Khadi & Textile Industries division
Supported by Khadi and Village Industries Commission (KVIC), MGIRI has been working on research and development for promotion of khadi, for example, establishment of design center for khadi garments, development of e-charkha, quality assurance procedure for khadi, low cost hank dyeing machine, improved technology for dyeing and soft finish of khadi fabric.
 Bio-processing and Herbal based Industries division
 Chemical Industries division
 Rural Crafts and Engineering division
 Rural Infrastructure and Energy division
 Management and Systems division

Services and Publications 
Short Workshops & Trainings held throughout the year 
Khadi Testing Manual, Herbal Manual
Original Patents

See also
 Khadi 
 Khadi and Village Industries Commission
 Ministry of Micro, Small and Medium Enterprises
 National Charkha Museum  
 National Handloom Day of India
 Make In India 
 Standup India
 Startup India
 Swadeshi Jagaran Manch
 Swaraj

References

Education in Maharashtra